Plaza Magazine International is an international publication, focusing on design, interior decoration and fashion with a "hip" Scandinavian perspective. Plaza Magazine is published six times per year by Plaza Publishing Group AB, and is sold in over 40 countries world wide. Plaza Magazine was founded in Sweden in 1994.

The 200+ page magazine contains articles on fashion, design and interiors geared for the rich and glamorous. The magazine contains many ads from houses such as Armani, Gucci, Hugo Boss, Rolex, Breitling, Chanel, Louis Vuitton, Ermenegildo Zegna, Canali, Corneliani and Chopard.

Plaza Magazine International is distributed and sold in over 40 countries all over the world. Plaza Magazine Sweden (Swedish version) is sold all over Scandinavia. Plaza Magazine Deutschland (German version) is sold in Germany, Austria, Switzerland and Luxembourg. The publisher of the magazine is Christopher Östlund.

External links
 Plaza Magazine UK/Europe
 Plaza Magazine Sweden
 Plaza Magazine Arabic Middle East
 Plaza Watch
 Plaza Publishing HQ
 Plaza Radio
 Plaza Designers
 Plaza Kvinna Woman Sweden
 Publisher of Plaza Christopher Östlund:

1994 establishments in Sweden
Lifestyle magazines
Magazines established in 1994
Magazines published in Stockholm
Men's fashion magazines
Men's magazines published in Sweden
Monthly magazines published in Sweden